Oxyurichthys tentacularis is a species of goby found in the Indo-West Pacific from the Transkei northwards, Zanzibar, and Madagascar to the tropical West Pacific.

References

Maugé, L.A., 1986. Gobiidae. p. 358-388. In J. Daget, J.-P. Gosse and D.F.E. Thys van den Audenaerde (eds.) Check-list of the freshwater fishes of Africa (CLOFFA). ISNB, Brussels; MRAC, Tervuren; and ORSTOM, Paris. Vol. 2. 

tentacularis
Fish of Africa
Fish of the Pacific Ocean
Fish of Indonesia
Taxa named by Achille Valenciennes
Fish described in 1837